Dane Anderson Weston (born 2 February 1973) is a former Antiguan cricketer. Weston was a right-handed batsman who bowled right-arm fast. He was born at All Saints, Antigua.

Weston made two first-class appearances for the Leeward Islands in the 2003/04 Carib Beer Cup against Trinidad and Tobago and Jamaica. He took a total of 4 wickets in his two matches, which came at an average of 40.75, with best figures of 2/17.

Later in August 2006, Weston played for the United States Virgin Islands in the 2006 Stanford 20/20, whose matches held official Twenty20 status. Weston made two appearances in the tournament, in a preliminary round victory against Sint Maarten and in a first-round defeat against St Vincent and the Grenadines. He took 3 wickets during the tournament at an average of 17.33 and with best figures of 2/23. He later played for the United States Virgin Islands in their second appearance in the Stanford 20/20 in 2008, making two appearances in a preliminary round victory against St Kitts and in a first-round defeat against Antigua and Barbuda. He again took 3 wickets in the tournament, at an average of 14.00 and with best figures of 2/14. His total of 6 wickets for the United States Virgin Islands makes him the teams joint–leading wicket taker alongside Calvin Lewis.

References

External links
Dane Weston at ESPNcricinfo
Dane Weston at CricketArchive

1973 births
Living people
Antigua and Barbuda cricketers
Leeward Islands cricketers
United States Virgin Islands cricketers